Nadia Georgette Blel Scaff (born 11 August 1981) is a Colombian politician. Since 2014, she has been a member of the Senate of Colombia, representing the Colombian Conservative Party.

References

See also 
 List of current members of the Senate of Colombia

Living people
1981 births
Members of the Senate of Colombia
21st-century Colombian politicians
21st-century Colombian women politicians
Colombian Conservative Party politicians